Athens Township, Ohio, may refer to:

Athens Township, Athens County, Ohio
Athens Township, Harrison County, Ohio

Ohio township disambiguation pages